Crypta is a Brazilian death metal band formed in 2019.

The band is formed by bassist/vocalist Fernanda Lira, drummer Luana Dametto (both former members of thrash metal band Nervosa), along with guitarists Tainá Bergamaschi and Jéssica di Falchi.

History
On April 25, 2020, after straining their professional relationship, Fernanda Lira and Luana Dametto left the band Nervosa. The following month, on May 20, they announced that they had formed a death metal band, the style they most identify with, called Crypta. They completed the line-up with guitarists Sonia Anubis (ex-Burning Witches, Cobra Spell) and Tainá Bergamaschi (ex-Hagbard). Despite the announcement, the band had been formed a year earlier (June 2019). On June 16, Napalm Records announced that they would release the band's debut album. The band's first single and music video released was for the song From The Ashes, about the well-known story of the phoenix.

The band recorded their first album in early 2021, at Family Mob, studio owned by Jean Dolabella (Ego Kill Talent, ex-Sepultura) and Estevam Romera. After releasing three singles (From the Ashes on April 21, Starvation on May 11 and Dark Night of the Soul on June 8), their debut album, Echoes of the Soul, was released on June 11, 2021. It was mixed by Arthur Rizk (Code Orange, Power Trip) and mastered by Jens Bogren (Opeth, Dimmu Borgir, Sepultura). The cover art was created by Wes Benscoter, who is well known for his work with bands such as Slayer, Kreator, Black Sabbath and many others. On November 20, Crypta performed their first concert, at the Porão do Rock festival in Brasília, with both an in-person audience and online streaming. An unreleased track from Echoes of the Soul, I Resign, was released as a single and music video on March 3, 2022.

On April 5, 2022, through their social media networks, Crypta lead guitarist Sonia Anubis announced that they amicably parted ways. On April 13, Jéssica di Falchi was announced as the substitute for Anubis during the band's already scheduled upcoming concerts and tours, including shows at the Wacken Open Air and Rock in Rio festivals, although she was not confirmed as an official band member until October 5. Along with the announcement of di Falchi's official entry, the band confirmed that their second album is scheduled to be recorded and released in 2023.

Members

Current
Fernanda Lira – bass, vocals (2019–present)
Luana Dametto – drums (2019–present)
Tainá Bergamaschi – rhythm guitar (2020–present)
Jéssica di Falchi – lead guitar (2022–present)

Former
Sonia Anubis – lead guitar (2019–2022)

Discography

Studio albums
 Echoes of the Soul (2021)

Singles 
 From the Ashes (2021)
 Starvation (2021)
 Dark Night of the Soul (2021)
 I Resign (2022)

References

External links
 

2019 establishments in Brazil
All-female bands
Brazilian death metal musical groups
Musical groups from São Paulo
Musical groups established in 2019
Musical quartets
Women in metal
Napalm Records artists